Tanu Weds Manu: Returns is a 2015 Indian romantic comedy film directed by Aanand L. Rai and produced by Sunil Lulla and Krishika Lulla. A sequel to the 2011 film Tanu Weds Manu, the film stars R. Madhavan and Kangana Ranaut in lead roles. Jimmy Sheirgill, Swara Bhaskar and Deepak Dobriyal portray supporting roles. The film was written by Himanshu Sharma and the musical score was composed by Krsna Solo and TanishkVayu. Tanu Weds Manu Returns tells the story of a feuding couple (Ranaut and Madhavan) who suffer from a series of misadventures when the husband is attracted to a younger, aspiring athlete (also Ranaut).

The film garnered awards and nominations in several categories, with particular praise for its writing, music, and the performances of Ranaut and Dobriyal. As of June 2016, the film has won 15 awards.

At the 63rd National Film Awards, Tanu Weds Manu Returns won the awards for Best Actress (Ranaut), Best Original Screenplay and Best Dialogues. At the 61st Filmfare Awards ceremony, the film won two awards: Best Actress – Critics (Ranaut) and Best Dialogue. The film also received nominations for Best Film and Best Director at the ceremony. In addition, Tanu Weds Manu Returns received 13 nominations at the Producers Guild Film Awards ceremony, more than any other film, and won the award for Best Actor in a Comic Role (Dobriyal). Among other wins, the film garnered two awards each from the International Indian Film Academy, BIG Star Entertainment and the Times of India award ceremonies.

Accolades

See also 
 List of Bollywood films of 2015

Footnotes

References

External links 
 Accolades for Tanu Weds Manu Returns at the Internet Movie Database

Lists of accolades by Indian film